The 1802 Massachusetts gubernatorial election was held on April 6.

Federalist Governor Caleb Strong was re-elected to a third consecutive one-year term in office, defeating Democratic-Republican Elbridge Gerry again for the third time.

General election

Results

References

Governor
1802
Massachusetts
April 1802 events